Xiong'an New Area is a state-level new area in the Baoding area of Hebei, China. Established in April 2017, the area is located about 100 km southwest of Beijing and 50 km east of downtown Baoding. Its main function is to serve as a development hub for the Beijing-Tianjin-Hebei (Jingjinji) economic triangle. Additionally, "non-core" functions of the Chinese capital are expected to migrate here, including offices of some state-owned enterprises, government agencies, and research and development facilities.

The area covers the counties of Xiong, Rongcheng and Anxin. Its name is a compound of the first elements of the names of two of them: Xiong and Anxin. The construction of the area is described as part of the "millennium strategy". Unlike other "new areas", Xiong'an's development is taking place under the direct oversight of the Central Committee of the Chinese Communist Party and the State Council.
The temporary government office of the New Area is located in Ao Wei International Hotel (Ao Wei Mansion) in Rongcheng.

Geography

Scope 

Xiong'an New Area is located in the North China Plain, between 38°43' and 39°10' north latitude and 115°38' to 116°20' east longitude, 105 km from Beijing and Tianjin, 155 km from Shijiazhuang, 30 km from Baoding, 55 km from Beijing Daxing Airport.

Hydrology 

The area is located in the Daqing River system of the Haihe River Basin. The average river network density is 0.12 - 0.23 km per 1 km2. Baiyang Lake, northern China's largest freshwater lake, is also included within the new area.

Climate 

The area is dry and rainy in spring, wet and rainy in summer, cool and dry in autumn, and cold and snowy in winter. According to the meteorological data of Rongcheng County from 1968 to 2016, the annual average temperature is 12.4 ℃, the record high temperature is 41.2℃, the record low temperature is -22.2℃, the annual sunshine hour is 2298.4 hours. The average precipitation is 495.1 mm.

Topography 

The area is located in the plain to the east of Taihang Mountain. The terrain gradually decreases from northwest to southeast. The ground elevation is mostly 5 to 26 meters, and the ground slope is less than 2‰.

History

By 2014, China's central government was considering to relocate a number of Beijing's administrative and back-office functions to Baoding.  According to the memoir Dealing with China by US Treasury Secretary Henry Paulson, Xi Jinping, General Secretary of the Chinese Communist Party, told him personally in July 2014, and said the idea his "own personal initiative". On 26 February 2014, after hearing reports from Beijing, Tianjin and Hebei, Xi Jinping considered the coordinated development of Beijing, Tianjin and Hebei as an important national strategy. After that, rumors such as "Baoding will become a political sub-center", "Baiyangdian City" and "Baiyangdian Free Trade Zone" surfaced on the Internet. Although the "New Urbanization Plan of Hebei Province" issued on 26 March of that year did not mention "sub-center", it was clear that some of Beijing's capital functions would be relieved. At the Central Economic Work Conference held at the end of the year, General Secretary Xi Jinping emphasized that the core problem of the coordinated development of Beijing-Tianjin-Hebei is to relieve Beijing's non-capital functions, reduce Beijing's population density, and promote economic and social development to adapt to the population, resources and environment.

On 10 February 2015, at the 9th meeting of the Central Leading Group for Financial and Economic Affairs, General Secretary Xi Jinping put forward the idea of “duō diǎn yī chéng, lǎo chéng chóngzǔ” (多点一城、老城重组) when considering the Beijing-Tianjin-Hebei Joint Development Plan. Specifically, "One City" (一城) is to study and plan to build a new city outside Beijing. On 2 and 30 April 2015, General Secretary Xi Jinping presided over successive meetings of the Politburo Standing Committee and Politburo of the Chinese Communist Party to discuss the "Beijing-Tianjin-Hebei Coordinated Development Plan", and considered the planning to build a modern new city in a suitable site in Hebei. On 29 February 2016, Premier Li Keqiang presided over a special meeting of the State Council to study the planning and construction of a city, and put forward specific requirements.

On 24 March 2016, General Secretary Xi Jinping chaired a meeting of the Politburo Standing Committee of the Chinese Communist Party, agreeing to name the new city "Xiong'an New Area". On 27 May 2016, the Politburo reviewed the "Report on the Planning and Construction of Beijing's Sub-center and Research on the Establishment of Hebei Xiong'an New District". This was the first time that "Xiong'an" appeared in the title of a report. The Politburo approved the "Implementation Plan for the Study of the Establishment of the Xiong'an New Area in Hebei", and the preparations for the plan were immediately carried out under a high degree of confidentiality.

On 23 February 2017, General Secretary Xi Jinping made on-site inspection to Anxin County and Baiyang Lake, chairing a symposium, listening to reports and delivering an important speech on the planning and construction of Xiong'an New Area.

On 1 April 2017, the Central Committee of the Chinese Communist Party and the State Council issued a notice, deciding to establish the Xiong'an New Area. In the announcement, Xiong'an New Area was positioned as a "millennium plan and a national event". Previously, the information was so confidential that local government didn't know it in advance. After announcing the establishment of Xiong'an New Area, Xi Jinping, when visiting Helsinki, Finland, gave important instructions to prevent real estate speculation. Secretary of the Shenzhen Municipal Party Committee and Mayor Xu Qin was also appointed as the Standing Party Committee of Hebei Province, and then the Deputy Secretary. He has more than 20 years of experience working in the National Development and Reform Commission and has been in charge of Shenzhen for 9 years. The same day, on 1 April 2017, the Provincial Government and the Hebei Provincial Party Committee decided to establish the Preparatory Work Committee and the Provisional Party Committee of the Xiong'an New Area. These were transitional institutions, under the authority of the Hebei Provincial Party Committee and the Provincial Government, responsible for organizing, leading, and coordinating the overall development and construction of Xiong'an New Area, performing the functions of organizing, coordinating, supervising political, economic, cultural, social, ecological activities in Xiong'an New Area.

On 2 April, a meeting of leading cadres was held in Rongcheng County. At the meeting, it was agreed that in the next step, management and control should continue to be a top priority, especially on land issues. The government must do a good job of management and control, communicating and propagating at all levels, and managing the power grid. The needs of the people need to be addressed as much as possible, and on the basis of strengthening management and control, it is necessary to accelerate housing relocation, planning and construction. The provincial government has also decided to assign a party cadre committee to temporarily take over the cadre work. On 3 April, the Preparatory Work Committee and Provisional Party Committee of Xiong'an New Area began working in Rongcheng County, temporarily renting Ao Wei International Hotel as an office location.

On 21 June 2017, at the working group meeting on planning and construction of Xiong'an New Area in Hebei Province, Xu Qin, the Governor of Hebei Province, read out the "Reply of the Central Organization Office on issues related to the establishment of management agencies in Xiong'an New Area in Hebei Province". Accordingly, the Xiong'an New Area Working Committee and the Xiong'an New Area Management Committee in Hebei, which were dispatched by the Provincial Party Committee and the Provincial Government, would be established. They were responsible for organizing, leading and coordinating the development and construction of Xiong'an New Area, as well as the overall work on development and construction management of the districts Xiong County, Anxin County, Rongcheng County and surrounding areas. At first, the Party Working Committee and the Xiong'an Management Committee established the Party and Government Office, Department of Reform and Development, Department of Planning and Construction, Department of Public Affairs and Department of Safety Supervision. After that, some agencies like the Public Security were added.

On 22 February 2018, General Secretary Xi Jinping chaired a meeting of the Politburo Standing Committee to hear a report on the planning and preparation work for the construction of the Hung'an New Are, approving the planning framework in principle. On 14 April 2018, "Outline Planning of Hebei Xiong'an New Area" was approved by the Central Committee of the Chinese Communist Party and the State Council. On 25 December, "The Master Plan of Hebei Xiong'an New Area (2018-2035)" approved by the State Council.

On 4 January 2019, the Standing Committee of the People's Congress of Hebei Province approved the appointment of Liu Guanghui as chairman, Member of the Judiciary Committee, and Judge of the People's Court and Ji Zhiming as the chief prosecutor of the Xiong'an Procuratorate. Xu Yaotong, a professor at the National School of Administration, believed that Xiong'an New Area may be transformed into an administrative unit of Hebei Provincial Government in the future.

On 7 May 2019, resettlement work in Xiong'an officially started. On 2 August 2019, the State Council approved the establishment of the China (Hebei) Pilot Free Trade Zone, which included Xiong'an.

On 29 July 2021, the "Hebei Xiong'an New Area Regulations" (河北雄安新区条例) was adopted at the 24th meeting of the Standing Committee of the Hebei People's Congress, stipulating that the Xiong'an New Area Management Committee is an agency directly under the Government of Hebei Province. This committee exercises economic and social management powers granted by the state and Hebei province. The regulations will be officially implemented on 1 September 2021.

Administrative divisions
The planning scope of the Xiong'an New Area covers the 3 counties of Xiong, Rongcheng, and Anxin in Hebei Province and some surrounding areas. The planning and construction will take a specific area as the starting area (about 100 square kilometers) for development. The medium-term development area is about 200 square kilometers and the long-term area is about 2,000 square kilometers.

Transportation

Railway

Xiong'an railway station, on the Beijing–Xiong'an intercity railway, was opened on 27 December 2020.

Baigou railway station and Baiyangdian railway station, on Tianjin–Baoding intercity railway, are within reach.

Airport
Beijing Daxing International Airport (opened in 2019) serves the area.

Expressway
It is currently served by two national expressways, G45 and G18, as well as two regional expressways, S3601 and S3700.

Real estate
A flood of footloose capital, much of it from Beijing, has been searching for properties in Xiong'an to invest, causing real estate price in this area to skyrocket rapidly since the announcement of the New Area. Local government has since imposed a temporary ban on new property sales.
 Besides, the registration of household registration in some places was also stopped, and many real estate speculators were arrested by the police. The model of real estate development in the New Area may use public housing in Singapore for reference, according to a senior officer's interview on People's Daily on 5 April 2017.

Activist open letter
	
In an open letter of activist Xu Zhiyong addressed to Chinese Paramount leader Xi Jinping, published on 4 February 2020 while Xu was sought by authorities, the project was called "political" and cited as an instance in which Xi had allegedly shown lack of capability in office. Xu was arrested later that month.

References

External links

New areas (China)
Geography of Baoding